The Victorian Goldfields Railway is a  broad gauge tourist railway in Victoria, Australia. It operates along a formerly disused branch line between the towns of Maldon and Castlemaine.

History
The original line was opened on 16 June 1884, opening up rail access from the established station at Castlemaine to the towns of Muckleford and Maldon. The area was prosperous, as Castlemaine and Maldon had both experienced gold rushes in the preceding years, and local residents had been petitioning the government for a railway since 1874. On 2 August 1884, a contract was let for an extension to Laanecoorie, however further construction was suspended after the line reached the small town of Shelbourne in 1891.

The line was served by twice-daily trains for the first forty years of its life, which was increased to four-times-daily trains in 1924. However, these were cut back at the end of the 1920s due to a decrease in the local population, and passenger services were eliminated altogether during World War II. This meant that the line was used by only a weekly goods train which went through to Shelbourne. When bushfire damage caused the closure of the Shelbourne extension in 1970, the remainder of the line was rendered largely useless, and it was officially closed in December 1976.

The response to the closure from the local community was swift, and the Castlemaine and Maldon Railway Preservation Society was founded in the same month, with the intention of reopening the line as a tourist railway. While Maldon station was intact, and was able to be used as a base for their operations, they were faced with numerous problems: a line that needed substantial repairs, a lack of rolling stock, and rebuilding the demolished station at Muckleford.

Reconstruction

Over the next decade, volunteers obtained and renovated rolling stock and by 1986, trains were able to operate on a one kilometre section of track out of Maldon. By 1996, the line from Muckleford to Maldon had been restored, with the platforms being reinstated and a small replacement building being constructed. Services were able to operate along a regular timetable, and the society set about reopening the Muckleford-Castlemaine section of the line.

The project received the support of the local, state and federal governments. The necessary physical work had largely been completed by 2003, but it took another year to secure the necessary approvals and sign an agreement with freight operator Pacific National over the use of its line into Castlemaine station, which is still in regular passenger use today. The section of line finally opened on 19 December 2004, approximately a year behind schedule.
, the Society has shown no plans to restore the dismantled Shelbourne extension in the foreseeable future.

Current operations
The railway now operates two return trips to Castlemaine on Sundays, Wednesdays and public holidays. Steam locomotives operate most services, although the Society also operates diesels during days of total fire ban or when steam is not available. During December, January and February all services are hauled by diesel locomotives.

The Railway also operates a number of special trains such as Ales on Rails and Murder on the Orient Express Trains. Additionally, the railway offers Driver Experiences, where customers can drive a locomotive and Footplate Experiences where you can ride in the cab for either the Maldon to Muckleford or Muckleford to Maldon leg of the trip.

For special local events such as "Mucklefest" the railway offers Rail Trolley (also referred to as the "Moon Buggy") shuttles for festival goers to ride on.

Rolling stock

VGR Locomotives & Railmotors

Leased Locomotives
Since October 2011, Steamrail Victoria have leased members of their fleet to the VGR in order to lighten the load on the railway's own limited fleet. This has seen use of K190, K153, D3 639 and Y164 on the Maldon branch.

Carriages

Guards Vans

Goods Stock

Highlights
29 March 1986: First section of railway reopened between Maldon station and the Bendigo Road crossing (approx. 1 km). The reopening train consist being K160-2BCE-42BU-16BCPL.

1987: Diesel locomotives F212 and T333 acquired from VicRail. F212 was transferred from Melbourne to Maldon by road. T333 was railed from Bendigo to Maldon.

31 March 1991: Locomotive J549 makes its first move under steam and returned to service later that year.

9 October 1993: Railmotor 61RM officially handed over to the VGR. It had been held by a group of railmotor drivers at Spencer St prior to being railed to Bendigo and then trucked to Maldon.

25 September 1995: Locomotive D3 646 retrieved from a park outside Maryborough Railway Station.

8 June 1996: Line officially reopened to Muckleford. J549 was used on the official train.

11–12 July 1998: First heritage rail weekend, promoted as "Steamfreight '98". A variety of passenger, goods and mixed trains ran with K160, J549, T333, F212 and 61RM over the 2 days.

July 1999: "Steamfreight '99", the 2nd such event held. A similar program of operations to the previous one. Highlights included K160 being renumbered K157 on the Sunday. A triple headed goods also operated with "K157"-T333-F212.

May 2001: "Steamfreight 2001", the 3rd such event to be held. K160, J549, T333 and 61RM operated. 2 L type sheep wagons were transferred by road from the collection at Castlemaine and restored for this event.

19–20 June 2007: The VGR held a Steam on Show Event using J515, K160 & diesel Y133. A variety of passenger, goods and mixed trains operated from Maldon to Castlemaine on the 19th, while regular services ran as mixed trains headed by K160 and J515 on the 20th.

26 July 2008: The VGR ran the first double-headed J Class working in thirty years, using J515 and J541.

6 September 2008: The VGR held the first "Picnic at Muckleford" event, combined with Steam on Show. The major highlight of this event was the first triple headed steam on the VGR (and the Castlemaine-Maldon branchline) with K160-J515-J541. A variety of passenger and mixed trains ran throughout the day.

14 June 2009: The VGR celebrated the 125th anniversary of the Castlemaine-Maldon line with a special train from Castlemaine hauled by doubled headed J class. Steamrail Victoria operated double headed R class from Melbourne as part of the festivities.

19 December 2010: E cars 2BCE, 20BE, 15BE & 18AE, were sold to the SRHC & transferred from Maldon to Seymour for restoration.

29 October 2011: Steamrail Victoria locomotive K190 transferred by rail from Melbourne to Maldon to provide back-up motive power. It left the railway on 9 March 2012. It returned for a second period of hire on 23 October 2012 and left on 23 June 2013.

26 November 2011: Another "Steam on Show" event was held. K190-K160 ran a special mixed train from Maldon to Muckleford with K190 leading tender-first and K160 trailing funnel-first. At Muckleford K160 ran around the train to form a tender-to-tender formation for the run to Castlemaine. The return from Castlemaine was run as a double-header with K190 leading K160.

12 May 2013: Diesel Electric Rail Motor Preservation Association Victoria ran a special from Melbourne to Maldon and return with 58RM. It was the first time a passenger train has operated such a trip since the last VR train on the Maldon line in November 1976. The railmotor crossed J515 operating the regular VGR service in both directions.

23 June 2013: D3 639 arrived at Maldon by rail from Melbourne on loan from Steamrail Victoria, making it the first time a D3 has traveled on the branch in forty years.

20 October 2013: J549 undertakes its first test runs after completion of a 9-year overhaul. During the overhaul the loco received new tyres on the pony truck and coupled wheels, a new smokebox barrel, cylinders re-bored, motion gear re-metaled and the tender bogie wheels re-profiled. The test run included a light engine trial around Maldon yard, followed by a line test to Muckleford and return with Y133. The following week it undertook load tests to Muckleford and Castlemaine.

26 October 2013: Steamrail Victoria and the VGR operate a special tour from Melbourne to Maldon and return, dubbed the "Maldon Steam Spectacular". R761-K190 hauled the train from Melbourne to Castlemaine where it transferred to the VGR yards. R761 was removed from the train and locomotive J515 and carriage 42BU were added. K190-J515 then ran from Castlemaine to Muckleford with photostops en route. At Muckleford J515 was swapped with J549 which had operated a Wedding Charter from Maldon. K190-J549 then continued to Maldon where K190 was left for another hire stint on the railway. D3 639 was attached and the train returned to Castlemaine. Upon its return to Castlemaine J549 and 42BU were shunted off and the D3 turned. R761-D3 639 returned the train from Castlemaine to Melbourne later that evening.

20 January 2014: K160 transferred by road from Maldon to Newport Workshops. It was moved to Newport to conduct a major overhaul. A finish date for this overhaul is unknown at this stage.

15–17 August 2014: Steamrail Victoria operate a special weekend tour from Melbourne to Castlemaine with K153 and T356 on 15 August. K153 then joined K190 which was already at the VGR to operate the special to Maldon early on the morning of 16 August. A series of workings using both K-class locos operated in either double-headed, tender-to-tender and tender-first combinations on passenger or mixed trains for the remainder of the day. Both K153-K190 returned to Melbourne with the mainline train and T356 on 17 August.

19 October 2014: To commemorate the Centenary of the commencement of the First World War, a special re-enactment of the troop trains that conveyed Australian soldiers to Ports for transport to the Warfronts was operated on 19 October 2014 under the banner "Answering the Call". The train was hauled by D3 639 from Steamrail and J515 from the SRHC. The D3 was decked out with flags and a special headboard while the train itself featured replica banners that appeared on the original troop specials.

13 December 2014: Centenary of the first DD-class locomotive constructed at Thompson's Foundry Castlemaine. Locomotive DD 893 rolled out of the foundry on 12 December 1914. To commemorate the Centenary Steamrail locomotive D3 639 was used to re-enact the locomotive steaming from the foundry (instead using the new VGR carriage shed to represent the foundry shed). The D3 also bore replica DD 893 plates as well as replica Thompson's Foundry plates.

13 February 2016: Steamrail Victoria transferred 31CE behind Y164 and T356 to Castlemaine for restoration at the VGR for future use on the railway. On the same day, Y133 was transferred to Melbourne for repairs.

18 August 2018: In conjunction with Steamrail's Maldon weekender. K153, J549 and K190 hauled one of the largest and heaviest trains to run on the VGR. With 6 sleeping carriages, a power van, water gin, Lowanna, the VGR 4 wheel goods set and Y133 hauled dead. This was the first triple header on the VGR in over 10 years.

Maldon Station fire
During the late hours of 20 October 2009 a fire ripped through Maldon station building causing major damage and loss of equipment. Not to be brought down by the situation, the VGR ran regular services as usual on the 21st hauled by K160. The major brickwork structure of the station was deemed safe to rebuild on. Contract work to completely rebuild the roof through VicTrack commenced on 4 February 2011.

On Thursday 30 June 2011 the VGR was handed the keys to the completed Maldon Station Rebuild Project.

References

External links

Victorian Goldfields Railway Official VGR website
Mark Parker's Victorian Goldfields Railway Photos Various photographs of the Muckleford to Castlemaine restoration, 2002–2004
Railpix Australia (VIC) Victorian Goldfields Rwy Photographs of VGR operations from 1998

Tourist railways in Victoria (Australia)
Heritage railways in Australia
5 ft 3 in gauge railways in Australia
1884 establishments in Australia